Washington-Guadalupe is a neighborhood of central San Jose, California, located just south of Downtown San Jose. It is one of San Jose's most historic Chicano/Mexican-American districts.  The area is a designated historic conservation district. The portion of Willow Street that passes through the district makes up the Calle Willow business district, made up primarily of Spanish-speaking businesses.

History

The Sacred Heart of Jesus Parish Church was built in 1920, in a Spanish Revival architecture style.

Washington-Guadalupe is designated by the city as a historic conservation area, owing to the high number of historic 19th and early 20th century architecture.

Geography
Washington-Guadalupe is located in Central San Jose, just south of Downtown San Jose.

The Guadalupe River Park goes along the western border of the neighborhood. Plaza Brenda López is located within the district.

Landmarks
Sacred Heart Catholic Church
Sobrato Center

References

External links

 Guadalupe-Washington Neighborhood Association
 City of San Jose Neighborhood Boundaries Map

Neighborhoods in San Jose, California
Chicano and Mexican neighborhoods in California